Zubčić is a Croatian surname.

It is among the most common surnames in the Zadar County of Croatia.

Notable people with the surname include:

Filip Zubčić (born 1993), Croatian skier
Martina Zubčić (born 1989), Croatian athlete
Tomislav Zubčić (born 1990), Croatian basketball player

References

Croatian surnames
Slavic-language surnames
Patronymic surnames